Firmin is a French surname and masculine given name, from the Late Latin Firminus, a derivative of firmus meaning "firm" or "steadfast". The instruction of St Paul to "be steadfast in the faith" gave the name great popularity among early Christians.

People with the surname

Agnès Firmin-Le Bodo (born 1968), French politician
Anténor Firmin (1850–1911), Haitian anthropologist, journalist and politician
 Col Firmin (1940–2013), Australian politician
 Giles Firmin (1614–1697), English minister and physician
 Hannah Firmin (born 1956), English illustrator, daughter of Peter Firmin
 Mickaël Firmin (born 1990), French professional footballer
 Peter Firmin (1926–2018), English artist and animator
 Thomas Firmin (1632–1697), English businessman and philanthropist
 Philip Firmin, title character of the 1861–62 novel The Adventures of Philip by W. M. Thackeray

People with the given name
 Firmin Abauzit (1679–1767), French scholar
 Firmin António, Brazilian businessman
 Firmin Ayessa (born 1951), Congolese politician
 Firmin Bouisset (1859–1925), French painter and poster artist
 Firmin V. Desloge (1843-1929), French-American industrialist and philanthropist in St. Louis   
 Firmin Didot (1764–1836), French printer and engraver
 Firmin Dugas (1830–1889), Canadian businessman and politician
 Firmin Flamand, Belgian Olympic archer (fl. 1920)
 Firmin Gillot (1820–1872), photography pioneer
 Firmin Lebel (died 1573), French composer and choir director
 Firmin Lambot (1886–1964), Belgian cyclist
 Firmin Marbeau (1798–1875), French philanthropist
 Firmin Monestime (1909–1977), Haitian politician and medical doctor
 Firmin Sanou (born 1973), Burkina Faso footballer
 Firmin Martin Schmidt (1918-2005), American Roman Catholic bishop
 Firmin Swinnen (1985-1972), Belgian theatre organist
 Pascal-Firmin Ndimira (b. 1956), Prime Minister of Burundi (1996–98)

See also
Firmin: Adventures of a Metropolitan Lowlife by Sam Savage
 Saint-Firmin (disambiguation), several places in France
 Saint Fermin of Amiens, 3rd century Catholic saint
 Firmin & Sons, Ceremonial Uniform manufacturer in the UK

References

Given names
Surnames
Surnames of French origin
French-language surnames